Smit is a Dutch occupational surname. It represents an archaic spelling of the Dutch word "smid" for "smith" (metal worker) and is the Dutch equivalent of the English surname Smith.

Frequency of occurrence in general populations 
Information for surname frequency in the Netherlands is limited by the end of comprehensive census taking in the year 1971.  The most recent readily available information is based on the 1947 census, for which both raw census data and surname frequency data have been made available to the general public.  In 1947 there were 29,783 recorded people with the surname Smit, while the general census provides a figure of 9,519,000 as the 1947 population.  Working with this data the frequency of the Smit surname in the Netherlands in 1947 can be calculated to be ≈0.313% or ≈3,130 of every 1,000,000 people.  By comparison, the most common Dutch surname in the 1947 data was de Jong, which had a frequency of ≈0.580%.

An imperfect comparison can be made to primary English-speaking countries as of 1998 based on research by the National Trust.  In 1998, the highest frequency was observed in New Zealand as 97.18 occurrences per million people, or ~1/30th the rate found in the Netherlands of 50 years before.  Among the nations examined in the National Trust study, relative frequencies for 1991 were: New Zealand > Australia ≅ Canada ≫ United States > Northern Ireland > Great Britain > Republic of Ireland.  The substantial difference between Canada and the United States indicated in this series is approximately 3.5 fold.

People 
Arts
  (1641–1710), Dutch painter
  (1916–2001), Dutch musician
 Anton Smit (b. 1945), Dutch screenwriter, television and film producer
 Arie Smit (1916–2016), Dutch-born Indonesian painter
 Bartho Smit (1924–1986), South African writer, poet, dramatist and director
 Carola Smit (b. 1963), Dutch singer
 Carolein Smit (b. 1960), Dutch ceramic art sculptor 
 Floortje Smit (b. 1983), Dutch singer
  (1910–1981), Dutch poet and journalist
  (1933–2012), Dutch voice actor
 Gert Smit (1944–1998), South African singer known as "Gene Rockwell"
 Guy Richards Smit (b. 1970), American performance artist
 Howard Smit (1911–2009), American film make-up artist
  (b. 1978), Dutch actor
 Jan Smit (b. 1985), Dutch singer
 Joseph Smit (1836–1929), Dutch zoological illustrator 
 Leo Smit (1900–1943), Dutch composer and pianist
 Leo Smit (1921–1999), American composer
 Lionel Smit (b. 1982), South African artist
  (b. 1993), Dutch actress
 Louise Smit (b. 1940), South African children's writer
 Marianne Smit (b. 1984), Dutch harpist
 Monique Smit (b. 1989), Dutch singer and television presenter
 Peter Smit (b. 1952), Dutch children's writer and publicist
 Pierre Jacques Smit (1863–1960), Dutch natural history illustrator in England
 Sjoukje Smit (b. 1950), Dutch singer known as "Maggie McNeal"
 Wisse Alfred Pierre Smit (1903–1986), Dutch poet and literary historian
Politics
  (1897–1994), Dutch Esperantist and politician
 Carry Pothuis-Smit (1872–1951), Dutch suffragist and SDAP politician
 Els Veder-Smit (b. 1921), Dutch VVD politician
 Jaap Smit (b. 1957), Dutch trade unionist and King's Commissioner
 Joke Smit (1933–1981), Dutch feminist and politician
 Michiel Smit (b. 1976), Dutch politician
 Neelie Smit (b. 1941), Dutch politician
 Nico Smit, Namibian politician
 Nicolaas Smit (1832–1896), South African Boer general and politician
 Paul Smit (b. 1953), Namibian politician and farmer
 Pieter Smit (1963–2018), Dutch politician
 Robert Smit (1933–1977), South African economist and politician

Sports
  (b. 1999), Dutch handball player
 Alexander Smit (b. 1985), Dutch baseball player
 Anika Smit (b. 1986), South African high jumper
 Angie Smit (b. 1991), New Zealand middle distance runner
 Arij Smit (1907–1970), Dutch boxer
  (b.1978), Dutch inline-skater
 Arvid Smit (b. 1980), Dutch footballer
 Daryn Smit (b. 1984), South African cricketer
 David Smit (b. 1976), English cricketer
  (b. 1981), Dutch cyclist
 Dillon Smit (b. 1992), South African rugby player
 Ettiene Smit (b. 1974), South African strongman
 G. H. Smit (b. 1976), Guernsey cricket player
 Gretha Smit (b. 1976), Dutch speedskater
 Hans Smit (b. 1958), Indonesia-born Filipino football manager
 Heinrich Smit (b. 1990), Namibian rugby player
 Jan Smit (b. 1983), Dutch footballer
 Jane Smit (b. 1972), English cricketer
 Janine Smit (b. 1991), Dutch speed skater
 Jasper Smit (b. 1980), Dutch tennis player
  (b. 1958), Dutch shot putter
 Jesse Smit (b. 1996), South African cricketer
 JJ Smit (b. 1995), Namibian cricketer
 Johann Smit (b. 1994), South African cricketer
 John Smit (b. 1978), South African rugby player and executive
 Julia Smit (b. 1987), American swimmer
  (b. 1940), Dutch footballer
 Kick Smit (1911–1974), Dutch footballer
 Klaas Smit (1930–2008), Dutch footballer
 Luke van der Smit (b. 1994), Namibian rugby player
 Maaike Smit (b. 1966), Dutch wheelchair tennis player
 Marjan Smit (b. 1975), Dutch softball player
 Marnix Smit (b. 1975), Dutch footballer
 Minouche Smit (b. 1975), Dutch swimmer
 (1979–2014), South African rugby player
 Peter Smit (1961–2005), Dutch martial artist
 Riaan Smit (b. 1984), South African rugby player
 Rie Smit-Vierdag (1905–2005), Dutch freestyle swimmer
 Roelof Smit (b. 1993), South African rugby player
 Sylvia Smit (b. 1986), Dutch footballer
 Theo Smit (b. 1951), Dutch road bicycle racer
 Willie Smit (b. 1992), South African cyclist
 Yasemin Smit (b. 1984), Dutch water polo player
Other
 Bart Smit (b. 1940), Dutch toy store owner
 Flip Smit (b. 1936), South African demographer and educator
 Fop Smit (1777–1866), Dutch naval architect, shipbuilder, and shipowner, founder of Smit International
 Jan Smit (paleontologist) (b. 1948), Dutch paleontologist
 Jan Smit (physicist) (b. 1943), Dutch theoretical physicist
  (1883–1972), Dutch Roman Catholic bishop
 Jörgen Smit (1916–1991), Norwegian teacher and writer
 Lou Smit (1935–2010), American police detective
 Mabel Wisse Smit (b. 1968), Dutch widow of Prince Friso of Orange Nassau
 Neil Smit (b. 1959), American businessman and CEO
 Tim Smit (b. 1954), Dutch-born British archeologist, music producer and gardener

Compound surnames
 Arie Jan Haagen-Smit (1900–1977), Dutch chemist
 Christian Reus-Smit (b. 1961), Australian international relations scholar
 Sianoa Smit-McPhee (b. 1992), Australian actress
 Kodi Smit-McPhee (b. 1996), Australian actor

Šmit
 Jože Šmit (1922 –2004), Slovene poet, translator, editor and journalist
 Vlado Šmit (b. 1980), Serbian footballer

Notes

References
 
 
  Note that the full URL is http://www.nationaltrustnames.org.uk/Statistics.aspx?name=SMIT&year=1998&altyear=1881&country=GB&type=name, but use of any url except the base included here seldom properly resolves.
 
 
 

Dutch-language surnames
Afrikaans-language surnames
Occupational surnames